Cerithiopsidella cosmia is a species of  very small sea snails, marine gastropod molluscs in the family Cerithiopsidae. It was described by Bartsch in 1907.

References

Cerithiopsidae
Gastropods described in 1907